Lakki may refer to:

 Lakki (film), a 1992 Norwegian film
 Lakki, Iran (disambiguation)
 Lakki Marwat, the headquarters of Lakki Marwat District in the North-West Frontier Province of Pakistan
 Lakki, Leros, a town on the Greek island of Leros
 Lakkoi, a village on the island of Crete, commonly spelled Lakki on road signs and maps
 Latchi (also spelled Lachi, Latsi and Lakki), a small village that is part of Polis, Cyprus
 Lakki hills in the Sindh, Pakistan